Lukas Sinkiewicz (born 9 October 1985) is a Polish-German footballer who plays as a defender who SV Lövenich/Widdersdorf. He last played for SSV Jahn Regensburg. He has represented Germany on three occasions.

Career
He signed a one-year contract with FC Augsburg in summer 2010, moving from Bayer 04 Leverkusen where he played between 2007 and 2010. Previously he played for 1. FC Köln. After his year in Augsburg he was part of the squads of VfL Bochum and SSV Jahn Regensburg before retiring in 2015.

Statistics

International career
Sinkiewicz played three matches for the German national team, all in 2005.

He also represented Germany's U-19 team at the 2004 UEFA European Under-19 Football Championship and the U-21 squad at the 2006 UEFA European Under-21 Championship.

References

External links
 
 
 
 Leverkusen who's who

1985 births
Living people
German footballers
Germany international footballers
Polish emigrants to Germany
Naturalized citizens of Germany
1. FC Köln players
1. FC Köln II players
Bayer 04 Leverkusen players
Bayer 04 Leverkusen II players
VfL Bochum players
VfL Bochum II players
SSV Jahn Regensburg players
Germany under-21 international footballers
Germany youth international footballers
People from Tychy
Bundesliga players
2. Bundesliga players
3. Liga players
Association football defenders